The Fox of Paris (German: Der Fuchs von Paris) is a 1957 war thriller film directed by Paul May and starring Martin Held, Marianne Koch and Hardy Krüger. It was a co-production between France and West Germany.

It was shot at the Tempelhof Studios in Berlin and on location in Paris. The film's sets were designed by the art directors Hans Kuhnert and Wilhelm Vorwerg.

Plot

Cast
 Martin Held as Gen. Quade 
 Marianne Koch as Yvonne 
 Hardy Krüger as Capt. Fürstenwerth 
 Michel Auclair as André 
 Paul Hartmann as Col. Gen. von der Heinitz 
 Viktor Staal as Col. Toller 
 Peter Mosbacher as Maj. Wedekind 
 Jean Murat as Yvonne's Father 
 Jean-Paul Roussillon as Francois, Yvonne's Brother 
 Jean Vinci as Col. Robbins 
 Walter Gross as Kleinschmidt 
 Hans Waldemar Anders as Gen. Dörffler 
 Reinhard Kolldehoff as Werner Biener, SD-Beamter 
 Erik von Loewis as Gen. Eisner 
 Wolfgang Völz as Manfred Däubele, SD-Beamter 
 Gerd Martienzen as Militär-Geistlicher 
 Joachim Boldt as Capt. Salter

References

Bibliography 
 Bock, Hans-Michael & Bergfelder, Tim. The Concise CineGraph. Encyclopedia of German Cinema. Berghahn Books, 2009.

External links 
 

1957 films
1950s spy drama films
1950s spy thriller films
German spy drama films
German spy thriller films
German war films
French spy drama films
French spy thriller films
French war films
West German films
1950s German-language films
Films directed by Paul May
Films shot at Tempelhof Studios
Films shot in Paris
Constantin Film films
1957 drama films
1950s German films
1950s French films